Benjamin Burić (born 20 November 1990) is a Bosnian handball player for SG Flensburg-Handewitt and the Bosnia and Herzegovina national team.

He is the twin brother of Senjamin Burić.

Honours

Club
Flensburg-Handewitt
Handball-Bundesliga: 2018–19

References

External links

1990 births
Living people
Bosnia and Herzegovina male handball players
People from Doboj
RK Borac Banja Luka players
HSG Wetzlar players
SG Flensburg-Handewitt players
Expatriate handball players
Bosnia and Herzegovina expatriate sportspeople in Germany
Bosnia and Herzegovina expatriate sportspeople in Slovenia
Handball-Bundesliga players
Twin sportspeople
Bosnia and Herzegovina twins